Valley Catholic School is a private Roman Catholic school in Beaverton, Oregon, United States, within the Archdiocese of Portland.

The school is a sponsored ministry of the Sisters of St. Mary of Oregon. Until 1991, it was an all-girls school and was named St. Mary of the Valley Academy (colloquially known as "St. Mary's"), but at the start of the 1991–1992 school year boys were admitted for the first time, and the school was renamed Valley Catholic School.

Valley Catholic has been accredited through the Northwest Association of Accredited Schools since 1965.

During enrollment, students can apply for VCES Valley Catholic Elementary School, VCMS Valley Catholic Middle School, and VCHS Valley Catholic High School.

Enrollment
Total enrollment for the high-school program was 256 in fall 1984, 243 in fall 1985, 230 in 1992, and 330 in 2014. Enrollment for grades 7 through 12 was 375 in fall 1998.

Athletics
The school's athletic nickname is the Valiants. In the fall of 2010, Valley Catholic moved from the West Valley League to the Lewis and Clark League. In fall 2014, the high school sports program moved from being a 3A program in the Oregon School Activities Association's Lewis and Clark League, to a 4A program in OSAA's Cowapa League.
Valley Catholic has won two 3A State Titles in Boys' Basketball in 2007 and 2014. Valley Catholic also won back-to-back 4A State Titles in Women's Volleyball in 2018 and 2019.

Activities
The school's dance team, the Charisma, took home state titles at the OSAA Dance and Drill State Championships in 2010, 2011, 2012, 2013, 2015, 2016, 2018, and 2022.

Notable alumni

Aparna Brielle, actress
Daniel Hardy, American football player
 Seema Mody, news anchor and reporter
Mariel Zagunis, multi-metal olympic fencer

References

Catholic secondary schools in Oregon
Educational institutions established in 1903
High schools in Washington County, Oregon
Education in Beaverton, Oregon
Private middle schools in Oregon
Schools accredited by the Northwest Accreditation Commission
Buildings and structures in Beaverton, Oregon
1903 establishments in Oregon
Roman Catholic Archdiocese of Portland in Oregon